The Byzantine–Serbian War (1090–1095) was part of a series of wars between the Byzantine Empire and the medieval Serbian states. The succession of medieval Serbian states went through several periods of warfare.

Prelude
The Serbian medieval state of Duklja gained independence from the Byzantine Empire in the early 11th century under Stefan Vojislav, who founded the eponymous Vojislavljević dynasty. Vojislav's son Mihailo succeeded him in the 1040s, who expanded his rule towards inner Serbian regions, became a king and ruled until 1081. He was succeeded by his own son, king Constantine Bodin, whose rule was marked by complex relations with the Byzantine empire.

In 1083, king Bodin appointed Vukan as governor of the Raška region in inner Serbia. He enlarged his domain, proclaimed his independence from the king , took the title of Grand Župan (Prince) and thus founded the Grand Principality of Serbia. Around that same time he began penetrating into Byzantine territory and raiding areas in and around Kosovo region, taking advantage of a Turkish incursion into Byzantine territory near Constantinople which preoccupied the Emperor Alexios I.

War
Much of the actual fighting took place in the Kosovo region, between the Serbian-held settlement of Zvečan and the Byzantine-held Lypenion, and along the Toplica River north of Vranje. Not much is said about Vukan's early campaign; however many historians speak of it as brutal. In 1093 he destroyed the village of Lipljan, at the time the seat of an eparchy under the Archbishopric of Ohrid. The destruction of an ecclesiastical seat provoked the emperor Alexios to raise an army and visit the Serbian border himself, probably in 1094. Understanding that his gains were now under threat, Vukan decided to send a letter to Skopje.

Vukan claimed in this letter that the conflict was provoked by agents on the Byzantine side of the border, and that he was now ready to be a loyal neighbor to Alexios. Alexios, despite not having achieved any goal presented when he set out, quickly accepted Vukan's offering as a new threat as a force of Cumans broke an earlier alliance with the emperor and crossed the Danube, pillaging Byzantine holdings in Thrace and Bulgaria.

Almost immediately after Alexios diverted his attention to the Cumans, Vukan returned to raiding Byzantine territory, capturing many settlements including the cities of Vranje, Skopje, and Tetovo. Alexios, preoccupied with the Cumans, sent his nephew and governor of Dyrrhachion, John Komnenos to stop Vukan. John was defeated by Vukan at Zvečan, which provoked another intervention by Alexios, who now marched towards Serbia with a sizeable army. Vukan once more sued for peace. Alexios, still pressured by the mounting issues and eager to plug one of many leaks, made simple terms which Vukan accepted. The emperor marched back to Constantinople with 20 hostages, including Vukan's two sons.

Aftermath
The second treaty would conclude hostilities between Serbia and the Byzantine Empire for 11 years. Following this treaty it also became commonplace for there to be Serbian royal family members that were 'court hostages' in Constantinople to ensure peaceable relations between the Serbs and Byzantines. 

In 1106, hostilities would resume between Vukan and Alexios.

References

Sources

 
 
 
 
 
 
 
 
 

Wars involving the Byzantine Empire
Wars involving medieval Serbian states
Grand Principality of Serbia